Communication ethics is how a person uses language, media, journalism, and creates relationships that are guided by an individual's moral and values. These ethics involve being aware of the consequences of one's own behavior and consequences; to “respect other points of view and tolerate disagreement.” Principles of ethics include being transparent and fair, as well as the integrity of one's own words. James Chesebro describes Communication ethics to be "ethical standards in communication should reflect more universal, humanistic perspective of humans... consistent with the principles which ensure the development and expanded opportunities for the individuals." Communication ethics can be different based upon different perspectives of the world; any perspective can have "codes, procedures, and standards [which] can conceptually and behaviorally frame communication in varying contexts."

Overview
Being an ethical communicator is defined as being honest, accurate, as well as being truthful. This stems from a person's morals and values, and how people define what is "good and bad". Throughout history, how journalists and the media have debated the terms of ethics on what can be shared out to the public. Today, communication personnel continue to learn ethics as current media changes and new forms of media are developed.

Communication ethics concerns not only the individual, but is of great concern to businesses, corporations, and professional entities. A business with unethical communication practices is not as effective as one with ethical communication practices. For example, a business with unethical communication practices may withhold evidence that it is harming the environment or breaking a law through a lack of transparence; while a business with ethical communication practices will immediately press a release to the affected parties. In this example, transparency makes the business more effective because it notifies its clients, prospective or established, providers/suppliers, or other affiliates of the potential environmental hazard or law violation. In other words, in this example, transparency will encourage trust and good faith, that the effective business will not conceal what is in the interest of its audience. For the sake of counterexample, there may be a time when censorship is the more effective business practice: take the case of trade secrets, when a design method or management tactic is not openly revealed in the name of competitive advantage; or when terms of agreement/use that a business may have with a service provider forbids transparency. In the latter counterexample, a business may use social media to advertise, but the social media service provider may limit the conduct of its users. Here, if the business considers social media to be a valuable service to achieve its advertising, it may have to censor its product or service to preserve its agreement with the social media provider.

History 
Historically, communication ethics begun with the concerns correlated with print media and has advanced towards digital technologies. Critics began assessing the harms of unregulated press in North America and Europe during the 1890s, which forced the creation of principles in the United States during the 1920s. Four major books that emerged from this decade were: Who's Who of journalism luminaries: Nelson Crawford's Ethics of Journalism (1924), Leon Flint's The Conscience of the Newspaper (1925), William Gibbons's Newspaper Ethics (1926), and Albert Henning's Ethics and Practices in Journalism (1932). These authors left a legacy on the meaning behinds communication ethics and confronted in their books of issues with ethics. Perpetual issues have always been with the concerns of privacy and confidentiality, and have been progressively been debated with the freedom of speech.

Philosophers 
Ethics can be traced back to the philosopher, Socrates (circa 470-399 B.C.E), who probed deep and broad concepts of goodness and justice. He believed that anyone, "given time to think and question, could gain insight into universally accepted rules of moral conduct".

His disciple, Plato (circa 428-348 B.C.E.), expanded on the concepts of goodness and justice, and argued that justice is achieved through wisdom. He also claimed that "good" was a value of what's moral to achieve a higher good.

Aristotle (384-322 B.C.E), who studied under Plato, developed the definition of virtue ethics, which is that a virtuous person will do the right thing primarily because he or she is of good character.

Hannah Karolak- "philosophy of communication ethics working from three assumptions: (1) through philosophy of communication one can discern, learn, and engage various communication ethics; (2) a multiplicity of communication ethics exist; and (3) in a postmodern moment characterized by multiple narratives, philosophy of communication ethics offers a space for the renewal of communication ethics scholarship." The first assumption explains that communication ethics can always be changing through time and evolution of society. The second assumption describes that there are multiple different views on communication ethics. The third assumption is a result of a combination of the first two assumptions of communication ethics.

These philosophers defined the meaning behind "good and justice" that is now integrated into the ethics of communication. In modern society, "good and justice" are discussed through media and news and what is considered right from wrong. Communication deals with these matters through everyday reports, interviews, and professional situations, as well as human morals in situations that deal with other people.

Fake News 
Ethical communication is crucial due to its emphasis on the responsibility of people to keep society civil. With the concern of fake news becoming more prevalent in today's society, the importance with ethical communication has been significant. Fake news has always been prevalent, it has just been shown in different types of channels of news, such as radio stations. "Now that online platforms, particularly social media, are becoming the main sources of news for a growing number of individuals, misinformation seems to have found a new channel." Due to the rise of social media, misinformation is easier to be put out in the world nowadays.

Ten Basics of Dialogic Communication Ethics 
These basic principles give professions and reporters a guideline on how to distribute information to the public without offending other people. It focus' on respecting information that people give and provides structure on how to ethically use the information.

 Seek to “elicit the best” in communications and interactions with other group members.
 Listen when others speak. Actively Listening, ("Listening is a complex process that is performed but perceived behaviorally." Understanding the message should not be enough, an active and engaging response should be involved with active listening.)
 Speak non-judgmentally. In other words, you should understand that there is more than one perspective aside from your own.
 Speak from your own experience and perspective, expressing your own thoughts, needs, and feelings.
 Seek to understand others. ("The understanding of ourselves and others as persons develops through a gradual process of self-other differentiation during which one comes to appreciate one’s perspective on the world as one among many.")
 Avoid speaking for others, for example by characterizing what others have said without checking your understanding, or by universalizing your opinions, beliefs, values, and conclusions, assuming everyone shares them. 
 Manage your own personal boundaries: share only what you are comfortable sharing.
 Respect the personal boundaries of others. 
 Avoid interrupting and side conversations. "Slow listening is defined here as a practice that requires the listener to pause and pay attention, or to tune-in to the mode of address, the scene, gesture and tone, the language used and the broader political or social context within which the speaking occurs." 
 Make sure that everyone has time to speak, that all members have relatively equal “air time” if they want it.

Universal Codes of Communication Ethics 
The National Communication Association founded in 1914 by 17 speech teachers who all left the National Council of Teachers of English. There are now thousands of scholars around the world in NCA dedicated to the study of teaching communication. They believe that unethical communication can threaten society and counter civility in everyday conversations. NCA endorses honest communication and focuses on educating others effective dialogue, discussion, as well as debate.

The obligation for truth is however not a legal matter, as there is no single code of ethics that applies to everyone. An example of a code is The 1996 SPJ Code, which is framed around the four principles: to seek truth, to minimize harm, to remain independent, and not hold themselves accountable. These principles reflect today's challenges in the growing internet presence.

A Code of Professional ethics for the Communication Scholar/Teacher, adopted in November 1999, has the behavior guidelines of integrity fairness professional and social responsibility equality of opportunity confidentiality honesty and openness respect for self and others freedom and safety. These codes are set as disciplinary acts to guide people in professions that deal with communication practices.

Confidentiality is crucial in all professions such as teachers, researchers, publications, and professional relationships. Ethics begins with ourselves and governs how we interact with other people. One being The American Sociological Association's (ASA's) Code of Ethics are enforceable rules set forth by the American Sociological Association. There are six principles and ethical standards that have been set forth to manage scientific and professional responsibilities.

Other professional codes include 

 Code of Ethics of the Education Profession (1975).
 National Education Association Representative Assembly.
 Ethical Principles of Psychologists and Code of Conduct. American Psychological Association.
 Statement on Professional Ethics (1995). The American Association of University Professors.

References

Human communication
Ethics